"The Man" is a song recorded by American singer-songwriter Taylor Swift, for her seventh studio album, Lover (2019). As the fourth track on Lover, Swift wrote and produced the song with Joel Little. "The Man" is a synth-pop and electropop song with flashy harmonies, murky synths, and rumbling beats. Over an uptempo production, Swift imagines how the media would treat her if she was a man. The song received a positive reception from critics, who praised its feminist message.

The track peaked at number 23 on the US Billboard Hot 100 upon the album's release, and entered the top-forty in Australia, Belgium, Canada, Czech Republic, Estonia, Hungary, Ireland, Malaysia, New Zealand, Norway, Singapore, Slovakia, and the United Kingdom. It impacted US adult contemporary and pop radio formats on January 27 and 28, 2020, as the fourth and final single from the album. On February 18, 2020, a live acoustic version of the song, titled "The Man (Live from Paris)", was released on all music platforms, accompanied by its live video.

An official music video for "The Man" was released on February 27, 2020, directed by Swift herself, marking her solo directorial debut. The satirical video sees Swift in her theoretical male alter-ego named "Tyler Swift", voiced by Dwayne Johnson, presenting several prevalent examples of sexist double standards in society, including objectification, sexualization of women, toxic masculinity, and patriarchy. The video received critical acclaim for its concept and Swift's transformation into a man. It was nominated for the Video of the Year, Video for Good, and Best Direction at the 2020 MTV Video Music Awards, winning the latter, making Swift the first solo female director in VMA history to win the category.

Background and composition

The recording process for Taylor Swift's seventh studio album Lover took under three months and concluded in February 2019. Joel Little was revealed as one of the producers for the album with the release of the lead single "Me!" in April. He co-wrote and co-produced four of the eighteen tracks for the album. The song title was revealed along with the lyrics "I'd be a fearless leader / I'd be an alpha type / When everyone believes ya— / What's that like?" in Swift's Vogue cover interview for the September 2019 issue.

"The Man" is a synth-pop and electropop song that features flashy harmonies and a murky synthesizer. Swift imagines the media's treatment of her if she were a man, over an uptempo production. Swift challenges societal sexist double standards, with lyrics including a reference to American actor Leonardo DiCaprio. Swift uses the actor as an example to explain sexism, singing "And they would toast to me, oh, let the players play/I'd be just like Leo in Saint-Tropez". In outtakes from an interview with Billboard in December 2019, Swift said she wrote the song not only from personal experience, but also from hearing the general experiences of women working across all parts of the music industry.

According to Billboard Gil Kaufman, "The Man" is a pointed statement about "how much harder women need to work than men to get to the same finish line". Jason Lipshutz of the same magazine described the song as a "biting look at gender dynamics within both the pop industry and celebrity-driven culture", noting that it is sonically composed of a rumbling beat and crackling synths and lyrically provides wry humor and an honest perspective. An animated lyric video for "The Man" was released on February 7, 2020.

Critical reception
"The Man" received acclaim from music critics. The Atlantics Spencer Kornhaber described "The Man" as "one of the most straightforwardly catchy songs" on Lover, and further called it Swift's "most explicit musical statement on sexism". He opined that the Leonardo DiCaprio reference is the "most memorable" line of the song. Brittany Hodak of Forbes praised the song as "the most important song she's [Swift has] ever written". She also stated that the song is "a brilliant portrayal of the subtle and not-so-subtle sexism women face every day". Times Raisa Bruner labeled the song as "a bombastic, empowering bop" that is "an anthem for anyone who's felt blocked by sexist double standards". Comparing the song to Swift's 2017 album, Rob Sheffield of Rolling Stone described "The Man" as "a righteous feminist bombshell Reputation could have used". Slates Carl Wilson opined that the song "widens the lens and makes a more convincing case for her [Swift's] grievances than on any beefing track she's ever written". He further described the song as a "synth-strut mode very reminiscent of Haim" that "takes aim at sexist music industry and media double standards and just keeps firing bull's-eyes".

Writing for Elite Daily, Sade Spence and Kristen Perrone stated that the lyrics of the song are "super bold and carry a powerful message about women". They further stated that the song is an addition to the "legendary canon of crafty takes on sexism" in music. Allie Gemmill of Teen Vogue stated that the song "gives women permission to keep challenging sexist double standards, and fans are here for it", adding that the "fierce" song includes "many incredibly good lyrics". Writing for Billboard, Jason Lipshutz called it "a complete jam" and ranked it as the 12th best track on the album, and further expanded that it "will draw attention for its searing subject matter, but it's also one of Lovers most complete productions". The same magazine's Gab Ginsberg opined that "The Man" is "catchy-as-all-heck". Writing for The New York Times, Jon Caramanica described the song as "excellent and pointed". Jordan Sargent of Spin negatively compared the song to "You Need to Calm Down", stating that the lyric "If I was a man, then I'd be the man" doesn't really offer much insight.

Release and commercial performance
On August 16, 2019, Swift announced the track listing of her seventh studio album, Lover, where "The Man" was unveiled. One week later, the project was released, with "The Man" serving as the fourth track. Next year, the song was serviced to the US adult contemporary and pop radio formats on January 27 and 28, 2020, as the fourth single from Lover. The following month, the track was issued by Universal Music Group to Italian radio airplay on February 14, whilst the live version was made available to digital download and streaming worldwide four days later.

In the United States, following the release of its parent album Lover, "The Man" debuted at number four on the Billboard Streaming Songs chart, number 23 on the Billboard Hot 100, and number 32 on the Billboard Digital Song Sales chart, all dated September 7, 2019. "The Man" The song peaked at number 20 and 10 on Billboard Pop Songs and Billboard Adult Pop Songs charts. In Europe, "The Man" charted at number 16 in Ireland, 62 in the Netherlands, 24 in Norway, 82 in Scotland, 63 in Sweden and 80 in Switzerland. It reached number 21 on the UK Singles Chart. It was also commercially successful in Oceania, peaking at number 17 in Australia and 15 in New Zealand.

Music video

Background 

On February 25, 2020, Swift announced via her social media accounts that the music video would be released in two days. The video was directed by Swift, making it her official solo directorial debut. Swift answered fan questions in the hour before the music video's premiere on YouTube on February 27, 2020. She stated that the entire preparation for the music video—including planning meetings, creating mood boards, scouting locations, and costume and set design—took several months. She also confirmed that there would be many of her trademark "easter eggs" in the video.

The video features cameos from TikTok stars Loren Gray (the second most followed on the platform at the time) and Dominic Toliver, actress Jayden Bartels, and Swift's father Scott Swift; actor Dwayne Johnson appears in a brief voice role. The video's production team includes producer Jil Hardin, executive producer Rebecca Skinner, assistant director Joe Osborne, cinematographer Rodrigo Prieto, production designer Ethan Tobman, and makeup artist Bill Corso. Swift's transformation involved a "muscle suit", prosthetic makeup, eyebrow wigs, and facial sculptures, which took between four and six hours to apply each day. She also worked with movement coaches Stephen Galloway and Spenser Theberge, as well as editor Chancler Haynes. Visual effects were handled by Ingenuity Studios.

Synopsis and analysis 
The satirical music video explores Swift's life as her theoretical male counterpart, an alter-ego named "Tyler Swift". The video presents numerous prevalent examples of double standards in society, and comments on the objectification and sexualization of women, toxic masculinity, patriarchy, as well as performative allyship. Throughout the video, the male version of Swift is seen rudely inconveniencing the people around him, leading a luxurious and promiscuous lifestyle, manspreading, receiving praise for the bare minimum, and throwing tantrums without consequences. It contains visual references to The Wolf of Wall Street (2013), a film involving the lyrically name-checked actor DiCaprio and cinematographer Prieto, and tennis player Serena Williams' match controversy with a chair umpire at the 2018 US Open Championships.

The video has several easter eggs alluding to Swift's other work, including Speak Now, Red, 1989, and Reputation graffiti on a wall. Fearless is written backwards, while the title of her eponymous debut album appears in a sign saying "Missing: If Found Return to Taylor Swift". The "missing" sign, along with another wordless sign that appears to ban riding scooters, references her battle with Scooter Braun and Big Machine Records over the ownership of the master recordings of her first six studio albums. Lover, the first album that Swift completely owns herself, is absent, but the word "karma" is written twice on the wall, a possible reference to Swift's plan to re-record her previous works thus lowering the value of the originals. The camera subsequently pans over a "Mr. Americana" poster for a film starring Tyler Swift, directed by Larry Wilson, and premiering at the 2020 Mandance Festival, a word play on Swift's Netflix documentary Miss Americana directed by Lana Wilson, which debuted at the 2020 Sundance Film Festival. Swift's alter-ego runs down a hallway giving high-fives to nineteen disembodied hands, alluding to double standards behind the walk of shame that women are often forced to take after a sexual encounter. The hands are said to be a reference to the 19th amendment of the United States Constitution, which granted women the right to vote in the country.

In the final scene, Swift herself appears as the video's director to instruct her male alter-ego to be both "sexier" and "more likeable" in the next take—a subtle dig at the entertainment industry's objectification of and sexist treatment toward women. Ending on messages of female empowerment, Swift then turns to praise Loren Gray for her acting performance as a tennis ball girl, despite her role consisting of nothing more than an eye roll. The end credits list Swift as the director, writer, owner, and star of the music video, Johnson as the voice of "The Man", and shows photos of Swift's transformation process into the male lead of the video. It ends with a disclaimer stating "No men were harmed in the making of this video".

Reception
Bryan Rolli of Forbes highlighted that the video is characterized by an "exaggerated and cartoonish" attitude "in a self-aware way", typical of Swift's "most memorable videos". He further expanded that "obviously, not every man acts like her [Swift's] character; that's not the point. The point is to make a caricature of the buffoonish men who feel the need to criticize successful women like Swift for merely existing and dissect every public decision they make, whereas their male counterparts would receive praise for the same actions". Avery Blank, also writing for Forbes, opined that the video is a "reminder that women continue to face challenges when it comes to owning their ideas and maintaining control over their own careers" and that the society "expects women to be team players and not worry about getting credit for their work". She further added that the video makes it clear to viewers that Swift "will not let people mess with her". Glamour's Chloe Laws wrote that the "empowering" video "calls out sexism and the industry's double standards", which is "a small part of the bigger journey she's [Swift is] embarked on lately", by "refusing to let someone else control her narrative". Vox Constance Grady opined that Swift is "one of our great pop storytellers", proved by the video that becomes "the climax of her quest to own her voice".

Billboards Rania Aniftos commended that Swift undergoes an "intense make-over" in the "visually stunning clip", to become a "bearded, belligerent corporate titan whose rocket fuel is non-stop high-fives, fist-pounds, empty praise and rounds of shots with his amped-up bros". Vulture's Zoey Haylock commented that Swift as a man resembles Harry Styles, Jake Gyllenhaal and Joe Alwyn combined, appreciating the makeup and prosthetics as "award worthy". Vogue's Hayley Maitland and Noami Pike described Swift's male alter ego as "the human embodiment of toxic masculinity". Rolling Stone's Claire Shaffer stated that Swift "dons full drag to portray the worst of masculinity". iHeartRadio Paris Close commended that the video "does well to demonstrate how the hubris of male privilege plays out in the real world". CNN's Lisa France opined that Swift is "unrecognizable" in the video, that "brings to life Swift's lyrics about how differently the world views men and women". Writing for The Washington Post, Katie Shepherd and Allyson Chiu pointed out that the video is Swift's "gender-bending takedown of the patriarchy", that "skewer toxic masculinity and double standards, while airing personal grievances with an industry that has often subjected her to intense scrutiny". They added that Swift takes aim at "the cultural norms that allow, and at times even encourage, men to develop overinflated egos". Fast Company'''s Starr Rocque stated that Swift "examines the ridiculousness of gender roles and weaves that into a satirical spin on her own personal experiences and observations", adding that Swift "catches a lot of flack, but she's a fighter and always true to her brand of female empowerment". Swift's masculine appearance as "Tyler Swift" has been compared with that of Christian Bale, Harry Styles, Jake Gyllenhaal, and Joe Alwyn.

Lyric video

An animated lyric video for the song was released on February 7, 2020, exploring visual themes of women empowerment, feminism, and workplace sexism.

The video depicts a power suit-wearing woman, the only female figure in a maze-like city full of taller and larger corporate male drones, as she tries to navigate through staircases that lead to nowhere. She is forced to run past the sauntering men to avoid getting trampled. When the woman finally reaches the top of a building, symbolizing her climb up the corporate ladder, the male drones push her off and leave her to freefall to death; thankfully, she is caught by another, benevolent, giant woman and shown to a place where all the women walk together in solidarity towards the city. The ending of the video implies that the true key to success for women is to lift each other up.

Some of the visuals featured in the video bear resemblance to those from the 2010 movie Inception, which stars the actor name-checked in the song, Leonardo DiCaprio.

Accolades
At the 2020 MTV Video Music Awards, Swift scored a win at Best Direction for "The Man" music video, and became the first solo female artist in VMA history to win that category.

Live version and performances
On September 9, 2019, Swift performed an acoustic version of the song at the "City of Lover" one-off concert in Paris, France. The acoustic version was also performed at a Tiny Desk Concert for NPR Music on October 11, 2019. During the 47th Annual American Music Awards, held on November 24, 2019, in Los Angeles, Swift performed a medley of her hits that included "The Man".

On February 17, 2020, Swift announced on her social media platforms the release of a live acoustic version of the song titled "The Man (Live from Paris)", recorded at her one-off "City of Lover" concert at L'Olympia in Paris, France on September 9, 2019. The song was released the next day along with the live video of its performance.Billboard commented that the "glorious" live video is a "work of beauty", that sees Swift playing acoustic guitar, with her looking "relaxed and confident as the audience sings back every word of the song". E! News stated that the video "will empower you to conquer all", where "the superstar once again proved her unbelievable talent". They added that Swift "lit up" the stage, with just a single spotlight, "as she plays the acoustic guitar, the audience cheers along to the feminist anthem". Calling the video "intimate yet grand", Uproxx opined that the song "retains its earworm qualities in the acoustic rendition", despite the original version being "a catchy, synth-led tune".

Swift included "The Man" on the set list for the Eras Tour (2023).

 Impact 
In honor of International Women's Day in 2020, "The Man" was added to playlists on streaming platforms such as Apple Music, Spotify, and Tidal. Public figures such as Malala Yousafzai and Kristin Chenoweth added the song to their International Women's Day playlists. Furthermore, Swift included the song in her Apple Music "Playlist by ME!", which was updated to spotlight songs from rising female artists such as Beabadoobee, Clairo, Phoebe Bridgers, Caroline Polachek, Celeste, Charli XCX, Daya, Grimes, Haim, Halsey, Léon, H.E.R., Kesha, King Princess, Marina Diamandis, MUNA, Oh Wonder, Brittany Howard, Margaret Glaspy, Princess Nokia, Selena Gomez, Låpsley, Yebba, and more.

In March 2020, British politician Liz Truss, the Secretary of State for International Trade and Minister for Women and Equalities of the United Kingdom, quoted the song's lyrics during a special International Women's Day debate in the British parliament, while talking about the need for gender equality across the workforce and greater protection for women against domestic violence. Truss stated: "And so that, in the words of the brilliant Taylor Swift in her new song, 'women are left running as fast as they can, wondering if they'd get there quicker if they were a man'."

American journalist Jody Rosen, writing for The New York Times, listed "The Man" as one of the "25 songs that matter now". Describing Swift as "pop's best humblebraggart", Rosen termed "The Man" as a "sly protest song", explaining that Swift "has been pop's top bellyacher, turning a now-familiar set of grievances into great songs". He added that Swift "channels that indignation into a broader protest against the sexism and skepticism that all women face". Rosen also opined that the song's "most hard-hitting line is a plaintive rhetorical question that calls to mind a #MeToo movement slogan: #BelieveWomen". 

Naming "The Man" as the "most important" song Swift has ever written, Brittany Hodak of Forbes'', commended that "the magic of "The Man" is not just that it captures a complex (and often misunderstood) issue so brilliantly and simply, but also that it conveys to Swift's female fans that even she isn't above the BS that so many of us are regularly subjected to". Hodak concluded that she is "hopeful that Swift's spotlight on the issue will spark a national conversation about sexism, power, and equality".

Credits and personnel 
Credits adapted from Tidal.

 Taylor Swift – vocals, songwriter, producer
 Joel Little – producer, songwriter, drum programmer, keyboards, recording engineer
 John Hanes – mix engineer
 Serban Ghenea – mixer
 John Rooney – assistant recording engineer

Charts

Weekly charts

Year-end charts

Certifications and sales

Release history

References

2019 songs
2020 singles
American synth-pop songs
Electropop songs
Songs about cross-dressing
Music videos directed by Taylor Swift
Republic Records singles
Song recordings produced by Joel Little
Song recordings produced by Taylor Swift
Songs with feminist themes
Songs written by Joel Little
Songs written by Taylor Swift
Taylor Swift songs
MTV Video Music Award for Best Direction